Cambridgea foliata (common name, New Zealand sheet-web spider) is a species of Desidae spider endemic to New Zealand. These nocturnal, arboreal spiders are distributed throughout the North Island of New Zealand and build large horizontal sheet-webs with a large number of knock-down threads.

Description 
C. foliata have a reddish-brown cephalothorax and greyish yellow abdomen. While males and females of this species are of a similar size with a cephalothorax width of approximately 5.8mm, males have significantly longer chelicerae compared to females. While males of other Cambridgea species possess a stridulatory organ on the dorsal surface of the pedicel and abdomen, it is absent in male C. foliata.

Contest behaviour 
In the summer season, mature males depart their natal webs in search of females, sometimes wandering into people's houses'. When they find a female's web, they will use their first pair of legs and chelicerae to defend the web and female from any other males which may intrude, with the largest males tending to be most successful at defending webs.

References 

Desidae
Spiders of New Zealand
Endemic fauna of New Zealand
Spiders described in 1872